Dobrčice is a municipality and village in Přerov District in the Olomouc Region of the Czech Republic. It has about 200 inhabitants.

Notable people
Vladimír Hurt (born 1948), sports shooter

References

Villages in Přerov District